Geloso, founded in 1931 by Giovanni Geloso, was an Italian manufacturer of radios, televisions, amplifiers, amateur radio receivers, audio equipment and electronic components. Its headquarters were situated in Milan, Viale Brenta 29.

In 1931 the company started the production not only of radio sets but also most of the electronic components with which they were built and, over time, also developed and patented many others.

After the Second World War, Geloso expanded and expanded his production, becoming from 1950 onwards, a point of reference for enthusiasts of consumer electronics and hobbyists.

The many products under the brand name Geloso were known throughout Italy and much appreciated abroad. The output consisted of innovative products known for their high quality, solid construction and reasonable price.
The main production consisted of radios, amplifiers, tape recorders, televisions, kits, and professional laboratory instruments. These were complemented by components such as capacitors, resistors, potentiometers, switches, connectors, transformers and microphones.

Publications

Geloso was considered a good businessman, but also someone who wanted to share his passion for electronics. In 1931, he produced a free quarterly publication known as the 'GELOSO Technical Bulletin'. This contained everything needed for the repair and development of its equipment, but also and especially, tips, instructions, characteristics, circuit diagrams and everything that technicians and enthusiasts needed to know.

Those were the years when there were no training centres; moreover schools specialising in electronics were extremely rare.

These technical bulletins had the merit of spreading, in a simple and clear manner, knowledge to people who otherwise would not have been able to learn and develop their passion.

Self-assembly kits

Another important contribution of Geloso were self-assembly kits. These kits enabled TVs and radios to be home-assembled almost from scratch.  Metal chassis were provided onto which components were fitted. There was also a user-friendlier line of pre-assembled, pre-calibrated kits and cabinets, knobs, keys, etc. - all branded Geloso. Printed instructions explained how the finished units could be set up and calibrated.
   
By 1969 - the year Giovanni Geloso died - S.p.A. Geloso had become an empire of eight factories. Production continued until 1972, when the business ceased trading. There were several reasons for this closure: fierce foreign competition, managerial problems, union demands and massive indebtedness to banks.

Some of S.p.A. Geloso's most successful products were: radio receivers, tape recorders, audio amplifiers, record players, television sets, radio and TV parts, ham receivers and transmitters.

Assembly kits 
Geloso's contribution to the knowledge and dissemination of radio technology was considerable, thanks mainly to the assembly kits that enabled the purchaser to build a television or radio receiver from scratch. The starting point was the metal chassis onto which the components were fitted. Other pre-assembled and pre-calibrated kits facilitated the work.

Thanks to the instructions, the entire set was calibrated and everything was completed and ready to be installed into a wooden cabinet with knobs, buttons, etc., all marked Geloso.

See also

 List of Italian Companies

References

External links
Geloso radio catalogue at Radiomuseum.org
Geloso specifications + images
Geloso Story
Download Bollettini Tecnici Geloso

Telecommunications companies of Italy
Electronics companies of Italy
Electronics companies established in 1931
Italian companies established in 1931
Amateur radio companies
Italian brands
Manufacturing companies disestablished in 1972
1972 disestablishments in Italy
Radio manufacturers